Love Land would have been the first sex theme park in China; the PRC Government suspended its construction in Chongqing in May 2009 and ordered it demolished for being vulgar and explicit. The park was to include displays of giant genitalia and naked bodies, and host an exhibition on the history of human sexuality along with sex technique workshops. The closure is a reflection of the conservatism with regard to sex in China.

The theme park was originally due to be opened in October 2009, but was demolished in May 2009, as it was deemed to be a negative influence on Chinese society.

The attraction would have been near Foreigners' Street, an amusement park than includes the world's largest toilet, the Porcelain Palace, which itself was purged of anything seen as vulgar by the Chinese authorities. Signs in Foreigners' Street were removed by the authorities.

See also
Sex museum
Love Land (South Korea)
Sexuality in China

References

Nan'an District
2009 establishments in China
2009 disestablishments in China
Buildings and structures demolished in 2009
Sex museums in China
Sexuality in China
Sculpture gardens, trails and parks in Asia
Demolished buildings and structures in China
Parks in Chongqing
Buildings and structures in Chongqing
Culture in Chongqing
History of Chongqing
Censorship in China
Erotic art